Colonel Sir Herbert Stuart Sankey  (4 May 1854 – 5 April 1940) was a British barrister and politician. The son of Lieutenant-Colonel H. T. Sankey, he was educated at Marlborough School and Christ Church, Oxford before being called to the bar at the Inner Temple in 1878.  He married Josephine Annesley in 1884, and they had two daughters.

Career 
Sankey practised as a barrister on the South Eastern Circuit, and as a counsel for HM Treasury. He held the offices of recorder of Fordwich from 1883-1902, Faversham from 1902–05 and Margate from 1905–13.

In 1901, he was elected to the London County Council as one of four councillors representing the City of London. Re-elected in 1904, 1907 and 1910, he remained a member of the council until 1913. He served as vice-chairman for 1907-08. From 1909 to 1913 he was commanding officer of the Inns of Court Officers' Training Corps, and received the brevet rank of colonel in 1913.

In 1913 he was appointed as Remembrancer of the City of London, a position he held until 1927. He was also a governor, deputy-treasurer and almoner of Christ's Hospital; a governor of The Regent Street Polytechnic and a member of the board of management of St Mary's Hospital.

Invested as a Commander of the Victorian Order (CVO) in 1918, Sankey was made Knight Commander of the Order of the British Empire (KBE) in 1927. He was also awarded a number of foreign orders.

References

1854 births
1940 deaths
Members of London County Council
Alumni of Christ Church, Oxford
People educated at Marlborough College
Members of the Inner Temple
Commanders of the Royal Victorian Order
Knights Commander of the Order of the British Empire
Officiers of the Légion d'honneur
Commanders of the Order of the Dannebrog
Commanders of the Order of St. Sava
Recipients of the Order of the Sacred Treasure
Recipients of the Order of the Crown (Romania)
Knights of the Order of the Crown (Romania)
Commanders of the Order of the Crown (Belgium)
Municipal Reform Party politicians
Deputy Lieutenants of the County of London